Nguyễn Thị Thật (born 6 March 1993) is a Vietnamese road and track cyclist, who most recently rode for UCI Women's Continental Team .

Major results

2010
 1st Stage 6 An Giang Television Cup
 2nd  Road race, Asian Junior Road Championships
2011
 1st Stage 2 An Giang Television Cup
 2nd  Road race, Asian Junior Road Championships
2012
 1st Overall An Giang Television Cup
1st Stages 2, 4 & 6
 8th Overall Tour of Thailand
2013
 3rd  Road race, Southeast Asian Games
 5th Road race, Asian Road Championships
2014
 1st Overall Biwase Cup
1st Stages 1, 3 & 7
 2nd  Road race, Asian Games
 5th Road race, Asian Road Championships
2015
 Southeast Asian Games
1st  Road race
2nd  Criterium
 3rd Overall The Princess Maha Chackri Sirindhon's Cup
1st Stage 1 
 5th Road race, Asian Road Championships
 8th Overall Biwase Cup
1st Stages 3 & 4
2016
 3rd Overall Biwase Cup
1st Stages 1, 5 & 8
 7th L'Enfer du Chablais
 9th Thun-West Time Trial
2017
 Southeast Asian Games
1st  Road race
1st  Time trial
 2nd Overall Tour of Thailand
1st Points classification
1st Stages 1 & 2
 6th Overall Biwase Cup
1st Stages 3, 4 & 7
 9th Road race, Asian Road Championships
2018
 1st  Road race, Asian Road Championships
 1st Dwars door de Westhoek
 1st Grand Prix Crevoisier
 2nd Grand Prix de Chambéry
 3rd GP Sofie Goos
 5th Road race, Asian Games
 7th Trofee Maarten Wynants
 9th La Classique Morbihan
 10th Overall The Princess Maha Chackri Sirindhon's Cup
1st Stage 2
2019
 Southeast Asian Games
1st  Road race
4th Time trial
 1st Tour of Zhoushan Island I
 1st GP de Fourmies / La Voix du Nord Women 
 2nd Erondegemse Pijl
 3rd Vuelta a la Comunitat Valenciana Feminas
 9th Flanders Ladies Classic
2022
 Southeast Asian Games
1st  Road race
1st  Team road race
2nd  Criterium
 1st  Road race, Asian Road Championships

References

External links

Living people
Vietnamese female cyclists
Cyclists at the 2014 Asian Games
Medalists at the 2014 Asian Games
Asian Games medalists in cycling
Asian Games silver medalists for Vietnam
Cyclists at the 2018 Asian Games
1993 births
Competitors at the 2019 Southeast Asian Games
Southeast Asian Games gold medalists for Vietnam
Southeast Asian Games medalists in cycling
21st-century Vietnamese women
Competitors at the 2021 Southeast Asian Games
Southeast Asian Games silver medalists for Vietnam